Megachile incana is a species of bee in the family Megachilidae. It was described by Friese in 1898.

References

Incana
Insects described in 1898